Ghetto Stories is a 2010 American crime film directed by John McDougal and Turk produced and distributed by Asylum Records. It was released on November 9, 2010.

Plot
Rival drug dealers struggle to make ends meet in the crime filled streets of Baton Rouge. Unaware that they are family, two young men from different sides of town wage a war on  each other that eventually culminates in a strong union.

Cast
 Lil Boosie - Marcus Hatch 
 Webbie - Jy Carter
 Tyrin Turner - Slimm
 Nicole "Hoopz" Alexander - Kayla
 Bun B - Savages' father
 Paul Wall - Prison Inmate 
  Lil' Trill - Trill
 Mike Epps - Lawn Service Worker
 La'rico Hill - Humana Humana
 Brandon Bradford - BiBi
 Lil Phat
 Linda Robinson  - Grandmother

See also 
 List of hood films

References

External links

2010 films
2010 crime films
Films set in New Orleans
American independent films
2010s hip hop films
Hood films
2010 independent films
2010s English-language films
2010s American films